The Calendar may refer to:

 The Calendar (novel), a 1930 novel by Edgar Wallace
 The Calendar (1931 film), a British drama film starring Herbert Marshall
 The Calendar (1948 film), a British remake
 "The Calendar" (song), a song by Panic! at the Disco on their 2011 album Vices & Virtues

See also
 Calendar (disambiguation)